In the study of diffusion flame, Liñán's equation is a second-order nonlinear ordinary differential equation which describes the inner structure of the diffusion flame, first derived by Amable Liñán in 1974. The equation reads as

subjected to the boundary conditions

If , more heat is transported to the oxidizer side, thereby reducing the reaction rate on the oxidizer side (since reaction rate depends on the temperature) and consequently greater amount of fuel will be leaked into the oxidizer side. Whereas, if , more heat is transported to the fuel side of the diffusion flame, thereby reducing the reaction rate on the fuel side of the flame and increasing the oxidizer leakage into the fuel side. When  , all the heat is transported to the oxidizer (fuel) side  and therefore the flame sustains extremely large amount of fuel (oxidizer) leakage.

The equation is, in some aspects, universal (also called as the canonical equation of the diffusion flame) since although Liñán derived the equation for stagnation point flow, assuming unity Lewis numbers for the reactants, the same equation is found to represent the inner structure for general laminar flamelets, having arbitrary Lewis numbers.

Existence of solutions

Near the extinction of the diffusion flame,  is order unity.

Generalized Liñán's equation
The generalized Liñán's equation is given by

Large Damköhler number limit
In the Burke–Schumann limit, . Then the equation reduces to

An approximate solution to this equation was developed by Liñán himself using integral method in 1963 for his thesis,

where  is the error function and 

Here  is the location where  reaches its minimum value .

See also
Liñán's diffusion flame theory

References

Fluid dynamics
Combustion
Ordinary differential equations